Varvara Gracheva was the defending champion but chose to participate at the 2021 J&T Banka Ostrava Open instead.

Arantxa Rus won the title, defeating Mihaela Buzărnescu in the final, 6–4, 7–6(7–3).

Seeds

Draw

Finals

Top half

Bottom half

References

Main Draw

Open Ciudad de Valencia - Singles